Ukáž Tú Tvoju ZOO is the eighth album by the Slovak punk rock/comedy rock band Horkýže Slíže, released in February 2007.

Track list

Personnel
 Peter Hrivňák (Kuko) – vocals, bass guitar
 Mário Sabo (Sabotér) – guitar, backing vocals
 Juraj Štefánik (Doktor) – guitar, backing vocals
 Marek Viršík (Vandel) – drums, backing vocals

Guests
 Karol Čálik (track 5)
 Irena Čajková (track 12)
 Vašek Bláha (Divokej Bill) (track 1)
 Pygo (Craniotomy) (track 7)
 Gréta Vargová (track 2)
 Erino Knotek (tracks 1,17)
 Laco Duda, Mišo Malicher, Tomáš Kuťka, Paľo Kolník (track 17)
 Juraj Štefánik ml. (track 14)
 Rasťo Toman (track 10)
 Sanchez (track 13)

External links 
Horkýže Slíže official website

2007 albums
EMI Records albums
Horkýže Slíže albums